Nicola Jane Reynolds (born 26 July 1972, Pontypridd) is a Cardiff-based Welsh actress.

Career
After appearing in the 1999 film Human Traffic, she appeared in a series of jobbing roles, including Clocking Off and High Hopes. Reynolds also appeared in Scrum 4 as Meg. She made her public break through in the children's CBBC show The Story of Tracy Beaker as head care worker Shelley Appleton. She appeared as Ros in Abi Morgans' BAFTA winning series "Murder" for the BBC, alongside Julie Walters, playing her daughter. During this period, she also became part of an ensemble around comedian turned actor Johnny Vegas. She has starred alongside him in Sex Lives of the Potato Men and on BBC Three's Ideal. In 2009, Reynolds also acted in a BBC1 Film Drama Framed, playing Bethan Hughes, a Welsh mother of four. In October 2013, Reynolds appeared in the BBC One's daytime soap opera Doctors, playing Dr. Robyn Pattison, a doctor in Letherbridge for a conference and has a fling with Dr. Heston Carter. In the last several years, she has returned to theatre in a number of successful touring productions.

Personal life
Reynolds has a daughter named Matilda.

Filmography

References

External links

1974 births
Actresses from Cardiff
People from Pontypridd
Welsh television actresses
Living people
Welsh film actresses
20th-century Welsh actresses
21st-century Welsh actresses